Eivind Albin Andreas Bolle (13 October 1923 – 10 June 2012) was a Norwegian politician for the Labour Party. He was born in Hol.

He was elected to the Norwegian Parliament from Nordland in 1973, and was re-elected on two occasions. He had previously served as a deputy representative during the term 1969–1973. He was the Minister of Fisheries from 1973 to 1981 during three different cabinets: second cabinet Bratteli, cabinet Nordli and first cabinet Brundtland. During these three periods he was replaced in the Parliament by Eindride Sommerseth, Karl Ingebrigtsen and Finn Knutsen respectively.

On the local level he was a member of Hol municipality council from 1959 to 1963, and later in Hol's successor municipality Vestvågøy. He served as mayor from 1971 to 1973, during which term he was also a member of Nordland county council.

Outside politics he worked as a fisher from 1938 to 1974.

References

1923 births
2012 deaths
Government ministers of Norway
Members of the Storting
Labour Party (Norway) politicians
Mayors of places in Nordland
20th-century Norwegian politicians